An experimental home is a home with new design or function in order to improve living conditions.

See also
Earth house
Hundertwasser 
The Ark (Prince Edward Island)
Xanadu House

House types
Home improvement